Enrique is the debut English album and fourth studio album by Enrique Iglesias recorded in English and released on 23 November 1999. The album launched two number one US Billboard Hot 100 hits, "Bailamos" and "Be with You".

Background

After the success of his first English crossover single "Bailamos", Iglesias signed a multi-album deal with Interscope and spent the next two months recording the first English album. Knowing that Iglesias was a Bruce Springsteen fan, Interscope chairman Jimmy Iovine recommended that Iglesias covered the Springsteen track "Sad Eyes" which had recently been released on Springsteen's collection of rare recordings Tracks. The album also contains a duet with Whitney Houston, titled "Could I Have This Kiss Forever", which Iglesias and Houston recorded separately. Iglesias recorded the song in Los Angeles and Houston in Hamburg, Germany with both of them singing with each other over the phone. They did eventually meet when they re-recorded the track for the single release. The album also included the crossover song "Bailamos" which had previously been on a special edition of Enrique's Cosas del Amor album and the Wild Wild West soundtrack.  The album cover was photographed by Pepe Botella.

Commercial performance
The album debuted at #33 on Billboard 200 albums chart and would go on to be certified Platinum in the United States for shipping 1,000,000 units. It was certified for two platinum awards by IFPI Europe, for selling 2,000,000 units all over Europe. The album was a success in Canada too, where it became 5 times Platinum. It achieved Platinum status in Australia and New Zealand and Gold in Mexico and other countries.

Track listing

Charts

Weekly charts

Year-end charts

Certifications and sales

References

1999 albums
Enrique Iglesias albums
Albums produced by Brian Rawling
Albums produced by David Foster
Albums produced by Rick Nowels